Live Music Hall (locally known as "LMH" or "Live") is a nightclub and music venue located in Ehrenfeld, Cologne, Germany.

Concerts
Many famous artists have performed at the hall, including Duran Duran, Stand Atlantic, Pearl Jam, UFO, Kingdom Come, H-Blockx, Babymetal, Bushido, Chvrches, Death Cab for Cutie, Samy Deluxe, Elbow, Jeanette Biedermann,  Troye Sivan, Melanie Martinez, Of Monsters and Men, Texas, Crowded House, Glenn Hughes, Porcupine Tree and Staind. Various concerts have been recorded for the TV show Rockpalast.

References

External links
 Official website

Music venues in Germany
Nightclubs in Germany
Ehrenfeld, Cologne
Wrestling venues